Hüseyin Yıldız (also known as Husseyin Yildiz in Belgium) (born April 27, 1979) is a Turkish-Belgian futsal player.  He currently plays for Paraske Bowl Morlanwelz and previously played for Brussels United, GDL Chatelet and Diables Carolo.

He is a member of the Turkey national futsal team in the UEFA Futsal Championship.

References

1979 births
Living people
Futsal goalkeepers
Turkish men's futsal players
Belgian people of Turkish descent
Members of the 25th Parliament of Turkey
Members of the 23rd Parliament of Turkey